Madison Central High School may refer to:

 Madison Central High School (Kentucky), a public high school in Kentucky
 Madison Central High School (Mississippi), a public high school in Mississippi
 Madison Central High School (New Jersey), a defunct public high school in New Jersey that was merged to create Old Bridge High School
 Madison Central High School (Wisconsin), a defunct public high school in Wisconsin